Skinner's Dress Suit is a 1917 American silent comedy film directed by Harry Beaumont and starring Bryant Washburn, Hazel Daly and Harry Dunkinson. It is based on the short story Skinner's Dress Suit by Henry Irving Dodge, which was again adapted into a silent film of the same title in 1926.

Cast
 Bryant Washburn as William Manning Skinner
 Hazel Daly as Honey	
 Harry Dunkinson as Willard Jackson
 James C. Carroll as McLaughlin
 Ullrich Haupt as Perkins
 Florence Oberle as Mrs. J. Smith Crawford
 Frances Raymond as Mrs. Jackson
 Marian Skinner as Mrs. McLaughlin

References

Bibliography
 Goble, Alan. The Complete Index to Literary Sources in Film. Walter de Gruyter, 1999.

External links
 

1917 films
1917 comedy films
1910s English-language films
American silent feature films
Silent American comedy films
American black-and-white films
Films directed by Harry Beaumont
Essanay Studios films
1910s American films
English-language comedy films